According to the Encyclopedia of Camps and Ghettos, there were 23 main concentration camps, of which most had a system of satellite camps. Including the satellite camps, the total number of Nazi concentration camps that existed at one point in time is at least a thousand, although these did not all exist at the same time.

List of camps

Early camps
Breitenau concentration camp
Breslau-Dürrgoy concentration camp
Esterwegen concentration camp
Kemna concentration camp
Lichtenburg concentration camp
Nohra concentration camp
Oranienburg concentration camp
Osthofen concentration camp
Sonnenburg concentration camp
Vulkanwerft concentration camp

Main camps
 Arbeitsdorf concentration camp
 Auschwitz concentration camp
List of subcamps of Auschwitz
 Bergen-Belsen concentration camp
List of subcamps of Bergen-Belsen
 Buchenwald concentration camp
List of subcamps of Buchenwald
 Dachau concentration camp
List of subcamps of Dachau
 Flossenbürg concentration camp
List of subcamps of Flossenbürg
 Gross-Rosen concentration camp
List of subcamps of Gross-Rosen
 Herzogenbusch concentration camp
List of subcamps of Herzogenbusch
Hinzert concentration camp
List of subcamps of Hinzert
 Kaiserwald concentration camp
List of subcamps of Kaiserwald
 Kauen concentration camp
List of subcamps of Kauen
 Kraków-Płaszów concentration camp
List of subcamps of Kraków-Płaszów
 Majdanek concentration camp
List of subcamps of Majdanek
 Mauthausen concentration camp
List of subcamps of Mauthausen
 Mittelbau-Dora concentration camp
List of subcamps of Mittelbau
 Natzweiler-Struthof concentration camp
List of subcamps of Natzweiler-Struthof
 Neuengamme concentration camp
List of subcamps of Neuengamme
Niederhagen concentration camp
 Ravensbrück concentration camp
List of subcamps of Ravensbrück
 Sachsenhausen concentration camp
List of subcamps of Sachsenhausen
 Stutthof concentration camp
List of subcamps of Stutthof
 Vaivara concentration camp
List of subcamps of Vaivara
Warsaw concentration camp

See also
 List of Nazi extermination camps and euthanasia centers

References

External links
 

The Holocaust-related lists
 
Concentration Camps